Teun van Vliet (born 22 March 1962 in Vlaardingen, South Holland) is a retired road bicycle racer from the Netherlands, who was a professional rider from 1984 to 1990. Van Vliet's best year was 1987, when he won Gent–Wevelgem, Omloop "Het Volk" and the Ronde van Nederland. The next year he wore the yellow jersey for three days in the 1988 Tour de France.

Van Vliet is the brother of the 1977 Dutch woman road champion Nita van Vliet and uncle of racing cyclist Kim de Baat. He is however not related to Leo van Vliet, another famous Dutch road cyclist in the late 1970s, early 1980s.

Major results

1979
World champion Track points race for juniors
1980
 track points race amateur championship
1984
Circuit des Mines
1985
Hansweert
1986
Aalsmeer
Grand Prix d'Isbergues
Groot-Ammers
Liedekerkse Pijl
1987
Bavel
Ronde van Nederland
Omloop Het Volk
Gent–Wevelgem
Profronde van Wateringen
Sas van Gent
1988
Tiel
Tour de France:
Wearing yellow jersey for three days
Ulvenhout

See also
 List of Dutch cyclists who have led the Tour de France general classification

References

External links 

1962 births
Living people
Dutch male cyclists
People from Vlaardingen
Tour de Suisse stage winners
UCI Road World Championships cyclists for the Netherlands
Cyclists from South Holland